Winfried Stradt (born 25 September 1956 in Paderborn) is a former professional German footballer.

Stradt made a total of 28 appearances in the Fußball-Bundesliga and 121 in the 2. Bundesliga during his playing career.

References 
 

1956 births
Living people
Sportspeople from Paderborn
German footballers
Association football forwards
Bundesliga players
2. Bundesliga players
SC Paderborn 07 players
Eintracht Frankfurt players
Tennis Borussia Berlin players
Alemannia Aachen players
Footballers from North Rhine-Westphalia
20th-century German people